Aiguillon may refer to:

Places
Aiguillon (Cèze), a river in southern France, a tributary of the Cèze
Aiguillon, Lot-et-Garonne, a commune in the Lot-et-Garonne department, France
Siege of Aiguillon, 1346
Col de l'Aiguillon, a pass in the Jura Mountains, Switzerland
L'Aiguillon, a commune in the Ariège department, France
L'Aiguillon-sur-Mer, a commune in the Vendée department, France

Other uses
Armand, duc d'Aiguillon (1761-1800), French military officer and politician
Duchesse d'Aiguillon (1604-1675), French aristocrat
Emmanuel-Armand de Richelieu, duc d'Aiguillon (1720-1788), French soldier and statesman
1918 Aiguillon, a main-belt asteroid
EFW N-20 (EFW N-20 Aiguillon), a Swiss aircraft